I Feel Weird is the third studio album by London based punk rock band Great Cynics. It was released through Specialist Subject Records in May 2015.

Track listing

Personnel
Great Cynics
Giles Bidder - Vocals/Guitar
Iona Cairns - Vocals/Bass
Bob Barrett - Drums

References

2015 albums
Great Cynics albums
Lame-O Records albums